The 2014 Montana State Bobcats football team represented Montana State University as a member of the Big Sky Conference during the 2014 NCAA Division I FCS football season. Led by eighth-year head coach Rob Ash, the Bobcats compiled an overall record of 8–5 with a mark of 6–2 in conference play, placing in a three-way tie for second place in the Big Sky. Montana State received an at-large bid to the NCAA Division I Football Championship playoffs, where they lost in the first round to South Dakota State. The Bobcats played their home games at Bobcat Stadium in Bozeman, Montana.

Schedule

The game with Eastern Washington on September 20 was not counted as a conference game even though Eastern Washington was also a member of the Big Sky Conference.

Game summaries

@ Arkansas State

Black Hills State

Central Arkansas

Eastern Washington

North Dakota

@ Sacramento State

@ UC Davis

Weber State

@ Cal Poly

Portland State

Idaho State

@ Montana

FCS Playoffs

First Round–South Dakota State

Ranking movements

References

Montana State
Montana State Bobcats football seasons
Bobcats
Montana State Bobcats football